Main Office of the New Castle Leather Company, also known as The Main Office of the Allied Kid Company from 1933 to 1977, is a historic office building located at Wilmington, New Castle County, Delaware. It was built in 1917, and is a three-story, steel frame stuccoed brick building in the Mission Revival Style. The building measures 68 feet wide and 30 feet deep.  It features a revolving door and curved granite steps at the main entrance, red Mission style tiles on the mansard, and large decorative iron bars and grill work on the first floor windows.

It was added to the National Register of Historic Places in 1985.

See also 
 New Castle Leather Raw Stock Warehouse

References

Commercial buildings on the National Register of Historic Places in Delaware
Mission Revival architecture in Delaware
Commercial buildings completed in 1917
Buildings and structures in Wilmington, Delaware
National Register of Historic Places in Wilmington, Delaware
Leather industry